Io e te is the twenty-second album by Gianna Nannini, released on 11 January 2011.

Track listing

Personnel 

Gianna Nannini – vocals, violin, guitar
Wil Malone – strings, piano, synthesizer
Thomas Lang - drums
Francis Hylton - bass
Miles Bould - percussions
Davide Tagliapietra - guitars
Giorgio Mastrocola - guitar (on "Scusa")
Davide Tagliapietra – guitar
Production: Wil Malone and Gianna Nannini
Recording engineers: Mo Hausler, Raffaele Stefani
Mixing: Pino Pischetola, Cenzo Townshend
Mastering: Tony Cousin at Metropolis Studios, London
Photography - Steven Sebring
Art direction and design: Alberto Bettinetti

Charts and certifications

Peak positions

Certifications

Year-end charts

References

External links
 Gianna Nannini homepage

2011 albums
Gianna Nannini albums
Albums produced by Wil Malone